Maluenda is a municipality in the province of Zaragoza, Aragon, Spain. According to the 2004 census (INE), the municipality has a population of 1,020 inhabitants.

Architectural Heritage
Maluenda is representative of the Moorish style in Spain, particularly that of the Jiloca valley. Exhibits of this are the castle and the defensive tower, together with the local churches of Mudéjar tradition.

Politics
In the 2007 municipal election, PP got 325 votes (50.08%, 5 seats in the municipal council), Spanish Socialist Workers' Party got 162 votes (24.96%, 2 seats) and the Aragonese Party got 150 votes (23.11% and 2 seats).

Gallery

See also
Ribera del Jiloca

References

Municipalities in the Province of Zaragoza